Love All The People: Letters, Lyrics, Routines is a posthumously released collection of routines, letters and lyrics by American comedian Bill Hicks. It was published in February 2004 in the UK, and November 2004 in the US. In May 2005 a second expanded edition was published. The book is a chronological selection of his works from throughout his career, presenting the gradual evolution of his attitudes and style, with a foreword from John Lahr. The book is split into four sections. The first section covers the years 1980–1991, the second section covers 1992, the third covers early to mid-1993, and the fourth covers late 1993–1994.

References 

Comedy books
American anthologies
2004 non-fiction books
Constable & Robinson books